The Chief of the Joint Chiefs of Defence is the professional head of the Armed Forces of Chile. He is  responsible for the administration and the operational control of the Chilean military. The current Chief is Major general Javier Iturriaga del Campo.

List of Chiefs

References

Military of Chile
Chile